Northern coastal scrub is a scrubland plant community of California and Oregon. It occurs along the Pacific Coast from Point Sur on the Central California coast in Monterey County, California, to southern Oregon. It frequently forms a landscape mosaic with coastal prairie.

The Northern coastal scrub's predominant plants are low evergreen shrubs and herbs.

Characteristic shrubs include coyote brush (Baccharis pilularis), California yerba santa (Eriodictyon californicum), coast silk-tassel (Garrya elliptica), salal (Gaultheria shallon), and yellow bush lupine (Lupinus arboreus).

Herbaceous Northern coastal scrub species include western blue-eyed grass (Sisyrinchium bellum), Douglas iris (Iris douglasiana), and native grasses.

See also
Coastal sage scrub
California coastal prairie
California coastal sage and chaparral ecoregion
Native grasses of California

California chaparral and woodlands
Plant communities of California
Plant communities of the West Coast of the United States

Mediterranean forests, woodlands, and scrub in the United States
N